The American College of Physicians (ACP) is a national organization of internists, who specialize in the diagnosis, treatment, and care of adults. With 161,000 members, ACP is the largest medical-specialty organization and second-largest physician group in the United States, after the American Medical Association. Its flagship journal, the Annals of Internal Medicine, is considered one of the five top medical journals in the United States and Britain.

Mission and history

Founded in 1915, ACP's stated mission is to "enhance the quality and effectiveness of health care by fostering excellence and professionalism in the practice of medicine."  In 1998, it merged with the American Society of Internal Medicine (ASIM). ASIM's focus on the economic, political, and social aspects of medical care both enlarged and complemented its mission.

Known as ACP-ASIM from 1998 to 2003, the organization re-adopted "American College of Physicians" as its corporate name from 2003 on.

Structure

The college is governed by a board of regents, the main policy-making body that oversees its business and affairs.   The board of regents is made up of elected officers. The board of governors serves as an advisory board to the board of regents, along with a various councils and committees.   The board of governors is composed of elected governors who implement projects and initiatives at a chapter level and represent member concerns at the national level.  The board of governors is composed of elected governors in chapters and regions of the United States, Canada, Central and South America, Japan, and Saudi Arabia.

The organization is represented in the American Medical Association, the Council of Medical Specialty Societies, and other associations.

Membership and recognition

Levels of membership are Medical Student, Associate, Member, Fellow (FACP), and Master (MACP). Fellowship and Mastership in ACP recognize outstanding achievement in internal medicine. Fellows are recommended by their peers, endorsed by their local chapter leadership, and reviewed by a national credentials subcommittee. Masters are nominated from among the Fellows of ACP for annual election to this group. Board certification  in internal medicine is not required, though potential members must be "board eligible."

Non-Physician Affiliate membership is available to licensed non-physician health care professionals, or a physician holding an internationally equivalent degree and who maintain their professional credentials to practice.

Publications and products
The American College of Physicians distributes numerous publications and products to members.  They include:
 Annals of Internal Medicine, the weekly peer-reviewed medical journal, in print twice per month and alternately online
 ACP Internist, an award-winning monthly newspaper for internists
 ACP Hospitalist, monthly publication written for those in hospital practice.
 ACP JournalWise, program that summarizes the most important medical articles from more than 120 medical journals around the world
 ACP's Medical Knowledge Self-Assessment Program (MKSAP) gives internists the opportunity to test their knowledge and compare results with national averages.  ACP also produces MKSAP for Students, and provides education and career information, and administers an In-Training Examination for residents.
 ACP Smart Medicine is a clinical decision support tool for internal medicine that provides information and guidance on a range of diseases and conditions.  Physicians can earn CME credit through the program. ACP Smart Medicine content from Annals of Internal Medicine, ACP JournalWise, and ACP clinical practice guidelines.

Activities

The Washington, D.C., office monitors and responds to public policy issues that affect public health and the practice of medicine. Activities include development of policy statements and communication with legislative and administrative sectors of government.

The Center for Ethics & Professionalism seeks to advance physician and public understanding of ethics and professionalism issues in the practice of medicine in order to enhance patient care by promoting the highest ethical standards. The sixth edition of the ACP Ethics Manual was published in 2012.

The High Value Care initiative aims to help patients receive the best possible care from physicians while reducing unnecessary costs to the healthcare system. The initiative includes clinical and public policy recommendations, curriculum, and resources for physicians. For patients, ACP offers resources about the benefits, harms, costs and treatments options for common clinical issues.

Education and information resources

ACP develops several types of clinical recommendations, including Clinical Practice Guidelines, Guidance Statements, and Best Practice Advice papers. The different types of guidance are meant to be read differently. Guidelines are seen as the strongest recommendation, while guidance statements review existing guidance and best practice advice reviews available evidence.

In 2015, the ACP advocated for a public health approach to gun violence, supporting restrictions on automatic weapons, universal background checks, and legal mechanisms to keep guns out of the hands of the mentally ill.

See also
 American College of Surgeons

References

External links
 American College of Physicians website
 American College of Physicians – the most current fact sheet
 Membership Classes – the seven classes of ACP membership
 MKSAP Online – the online version of the ACP's flagship self-assessment program

Medical associations based in the United States
Organizations based in Philadelphia
Medical and health organizations based in Pennsylvania